Clarence Dock was a dock on the River Mersey, England, and part of the Port of Liverpool. Situated in the northern dock system in Vauxhall, it was connected to Trafalgar Dock.

History
Designed by Jesse Hartley, the dock opened on 16 September 1830. Clarence Dock was named after William, Duke of Clarence, who became William IV.

It was built as a self-contained steamship dock facility. This was to avoid the risk of fire to wooden-hulled sailing vessels then using the other docks.

The dock was the principal berth for the Irish ferry ships. During the Irish famine in the 1840s over 1.3 million Irish people travelled through the dock. After many weeks or months, many took a ship to America from Waterloo Dock, there being fewer direct sailings to America from Ireland at this time. However many thousands made their home in Liverpool. Others moved to London and other British towns and cities in search of work.

The dock closed in 1928, and in 1929 was filled in when the site was redeveloped as power station.

Clarence Dock power station 
Clarence Dock power station was constructed for Liverpool Corporation in 1931 to be an integral part of the local electricity grid system supplying electricity throughout Liverpool. The station plant comprised a low pressure station (No. 1) and a later high pressure station (No. 2) both based on coal-fired, water tube boilers and steam turbine driven alternators.

The plant in the low pressure station (installed 1931–32) comprised:

Boilers (all coal-fired)

 4 × 160,000 pounds per hour (20.16 kg/s) of steam at 450 psi and 775 °F (31.0 bar and 413 °C)
 4 × 200,000 lb/hr (25.20 kg/s) of steam at 450 psi and 775 °F (31.0 bar and 413 °C)

Turbo-alternators

 2 × 51.25 MW twin cylinder Metropolitan-Vickers, 1,500 rpm, 7,250 kV, 3-phase, 50 Hz.

The plant in the high pressure station (installed 1937–53) comprised:

Boilers (all initially coal-fired, converted to oil-firing in the 1960s)

 6 × 200,000 lb/hr (25.25 kg/s) of steam at 630 psi and 825 °F (43.45 bar and 441 °C)
 1 × 250,000 lb/hr (31.5 kg/s) of steam at above conditions
 5 × 350,000 lb/hr (44.1 kg/s) of steam at above conditions

Turbo-alternators

 5 × 53.5 MW Metropolitan-Vickers, 1,500 rpm, 33 kV, 3-phase, 50 Hz.

The generating capacity, electricity output and thermal efficiency of the stations were as shown in the tables.

By 1972 the No. 1 station had been decommissioned and the No. 2 station converted to oil firing. The No. 2 station was decommissioned in the early 1980s.

The three large chimneys of the Clarence Dock Power Station were a familiar local landmark, known as the Three Sisters, until the power station was demolished in 1994.

Present

The two Clarence Graving Docks are still extant and accessible via what remains of Trafalgar Dock. On 17 July 2006, Irish vocal pop band Westlife held a concert for their Face to Face Tour supporting their album Face to Face.

As part of the Liverpool Waters development, Clarence Dock will become one of the clusters of tall buildings. It was one of the two clusters of tall high-rise buildings which have been agreed between Peel Holdings and English Heritage.

In 2004 it was proposed that a 60,000 seater stadium for Everton FC be built at Kings Dock by the Mersey Docks & Harbour Company and the NWDA. This would have included a rapid rail service to be financed by the NWDA. Nothing became of this. However in 2016 Northern docks emerged as one of two possible new locations for a new ground for Everton.

References

Sources

Further reading

External links

 
 Site of Clarence Dock aerial photo
 Clarence Dock Power Station photo

Liverpool docks
Redeveloped ports and waterfronts in Merseyside
Clarence Dock
1830 establishments in England